Musquodoboit Valley / Dutch Settlement is a Canadian administrative region in Nova Scotia's Halifax Regional Municipality.

It is a rural area across the northern part of Halifax County comprising the Musquodoboit Valley and the areas through to the county line in the Shubenacadie Valley, terminating at the community of Dutch Settlement.

References

Communities in Halifax, Nova Scotia